The Liberal Party (Spanish: Partido Liberal, PL) was one of two major political parties in Bolivia in the late 19th century and the first half of the 20th century. The other was the Conservative Party. The Liberal Party was formally founded in 1883 by Eliodoro Camacho. The party espoused freedom of religion, a strict separation between church and state, legal acceptance of civil marriages and divorce, and strict adherence to democratic procedures. When the party took power in 1899, it moved the base of the presidency and the Congress to La Paz, which became the de facto capital city. The Supreme Court remained in Sucre. To this day, Sucre is the de jure capital of Bolivia while La Paz acts as the de facto seat of government.

Between 1899 and 1920, all of the Presidents of Bolivia were members of the Liberal Party, supported by the tin-mining oligarchy until the Republican Party took power in a coup in 1920.

The last Liberal president was José Luis Tejada Sorzano, who served between 1934 and 1936.

By 1940, however, the party had formed a Concordance with their erstwhile Republican opponents to counter the rising tide of radical or revolutionary parties. A Concordance supported the candidate Enrique Peñaranda.

In 1947, the Liberal Party's Luis Femando Guachalla narrowly lost to Enrique Hertzog of the PURS.

In the 1951 elections, Tomás Manuel Elío ran for the Liberal Party but received far fewer votes than the winner.

For the 1966 elections, the Liberal Party was a component of the Democratic Institutionalist Alliance, with the PURS's Enrique Hertzog as the coalition's presidential candidate. He polled 11,400 votes (01.13%) and came sixth.

In 1978 Liberal Party allied with the Nationalist Union of the People and its candidate Juan Pereda.

The Liberal Party has had no political power in decades, and its current status is unknown; it is presumed defunct.

See also
History of Bolivia (1809–1920)

Notes

1883 establishments in Bolivia
Defunct political parties in Bolivia
Liberal parties in Bolivia
Political parties established in 1883